Mary Wade (1775–1859) was a British convict sent to Australia.

Mary Wade also refer to:

Mary Julia Wade 1928–2005), Australian palaeontologist
Mary Hazelton Wade (1860–1936), American writer
Jennie Wade (Mary Virginia Wade, 1843–1863), woman killed during the American Civil War